Alon Carmeli  אלון כרמלי (born December 19, 1964) is an Israeli businessman. He is a Founder and the Active Chairman of the Board of Directors, of TopT, טופטי. Carmeli is a member of the board of directors in Sapir Corp Ltd., in Navin Systems Ltd. and in Adam Teva Vadin (NGO). He was a Founder and the Active Chairman of the Board of Directors, of Canzon, קנזון, a publicly traded company in TASE. Canzon developed a Cannabis Based Product’s Brand, and e-commerce platform, www.canzon.com. Carmeli was the CEO of Babylon Ltd, an online translation company. In 2012 Calcalist financial news site ranked Alon Carmeli as one of Israel's 50 best CEOs. Carmeli left Babylon in 2013.

Biography
Alon Carmeli spent his formative years in Haifa, Israel. Alon is the son of Amos Carmeli, a journalist who won the Sokolov Award in 2000, and Tamar Carmeli, an athlete  who has won medals in international championships and tournaments for the blind. Carmeli attended Hebrew Reali School of Haifa. He holds an Executive MBA from the Tel Aviv University  where he graduated with honors receiving a BBus the Business College, Tel Aviv.

Carmeli lives in Herzliya. He is married to Nurit, daughter of Avraham Lanir and sister of Noam Lanir and has four children.

References

External links
 

 
 
Babylon Translation Software 

1964 births
Living people
People from Haifa
Tel Aviv University alumni